Samael (Sammāʾēl, "Venom/Poison of God"; , Samsama'il or , Samail; alternatively Smal, Smil, Samil, or Samiel) is an archangel in Talmudic and post-Talmudic lore; a figure who is the accuser or adversary (Satan as mentioned in the Book of Job), seducer, and destroyer (Mashhit as mentioned in the Book of Exodus).

Although many of his functions resemble the Christian notion of Satan, to the point of being sometimes identified as a fallen angel, he is not necessarily evil, since his functions are also regarded as resulting in good, such as destroying sinners.

He is considered in Midrashic texts to be a member of the heavenly host with often grim and destructive duties. One of Samael's greatest roles in Jewish lore is that of the main angel of death and the head of satans. Although he condones the sins of man, he remains one of God's servants. He appears frequently in the story of the Garden of Eden and engineered the fall of Adam and Eve with a snake in writings during the Second Temple period. However, the serpent is not a form of Samael, but a beast he rode like a camel. In a single account he is also believed to be the father of Cain, as well as the partner of Lilith. In early Talmudic and Midrashic literature he is not identified with Satan yet. Only in later Midrashim he is entitled "head of all the satans".

As guardian angel and prince of Rome, he is the archenemy of Israel. By the beginning of Jewish culture in Europe, Samael had been established as a representative of Christianity, due to his identification with Rome.

In some Gnostic cosmologies, Samael's role as source of evil became identified with the Demiurge, the creator of the material world. Although probably both accounts originate from the same source, the Gnostic development differs from the Jewish development of Samael, in which Samael is merely an angel and servant of God.

Judaism

Second Temple period and posteriority 

Samael was first mentioned during the Second Temple Period and immediately after its destruction. He is apparently first mentioned in the Book of Enoch along with other rebellious angels. In Enoch 1 he is one of the Watchers who descended to Earth to copulate with human women, although he is not their leader, this being Semyaza.

In the Greek Apocalypse of Baruch, he is the dominant evil figure. Samael plants the Tree of knowledge, thereupon he is banished and cursed by God. To take revenge, he tempts Adam and Eve into sin by taking the form of the serpent.

He appears further as the embodiment of evil in the Ascension of Isaiah, often identified as:

 Melkira (melek ra, 'king of evil, 'king of the wicked');
 Malkira / Malchira (malakh/malach ra, 'messenger of evil' or 'angel of iniquity');
 Belkira (prob. , baal qir, 'lord of the wall'); or
 Bechira (bachir ra, 'the elect of evil, chosen by evil').

The names Belial and Satan are also applied to him and he gains control of King Manasseh in order to accuse Isaiah of treason.

Talmudic-Midrashic literature
In Talmudic-Midrashic literature, Samael's role as an agent of evil is rather marginal, but from the fifth or sixth century onward, this name again becomes one of the most prominent among the demonic entities. Samael has not been identified with the angel of death in the Talmud.

In the Exodus Rabbah, Samael is depicted as the accuser in the heavenly court and tempting to sin, while Michael defends Israel's actions. Here, Samael is identified with Satan. While Satan describes his function as an "accuser," Samael is considered to be his proper name. He also fulfills the role of the Angel of Death, when he comes to take the soul of Moses and is called the leader of satans.

The title of satan is also applied to him in the midrash Pirke De-Rabbi Eliezer, where he is the chief of the fallen angels, and a twelve-winged seraph. According to the text, Samael opposed the creation of Adam and descended to Earth to tempt him into evil. Riding the serpent, he convinces Eve to eat the forbidden fruit. His role here might be similar to the Islamic idea of Iblis, who refused to prostrate himself before Adam because he consists of fire and Adam merely from dust. The midrash also reveals Samael fathered Cain with Eve.

In the Midrash Konen, he is the ruler of the third hell. Several sources, such as Yalkut Shimoni (I, 110) describe him as the guardian angel of Esau relating him to Rome, the one who wrestled with Jacob, the angel who ordered Abraham to sacrifice Isaac, and a patron of Edom.

Kabbalah
In Kabbalah (A. E. Waite, 255), Samael is described as the "severity of God," and is listed as fifth of the archangels of the world of Briah. Among his portions are Esau, the people who inherent the sword and bring war; the goats and se'irim (demons); and the destroyer angels.

Although both Samael and Lilith are major demons in earlier Jewish traditions, they do not appear paired until the second half of the thirteenth century, when they are introduced together. Lilith is a demon created alongside Adam, originally created for the role Eve would fill, who then becomes Samael's bride. With her, Samael created a host of demon children, including a son, the "Sword of Samael" (or of Asmodai).

In the Kabbalistic work Treatise on the Left Emanation, Samael is part of the Qliphoth, prince of all demons, and spouse of Lilith. The two are said to parallel Adam and Eve, being emanated together from the Throne of Glory as a counterpart. Asmodeus is also mentioned to be subservient to Samael and married to a younger, lesser Lilith. According to the treatise, God castrated Samael in order not to fill the world with their demonic offspring, this being the reason why Lilith seeks to fornicate with men.

In the Zohar, one of Kabbalah's main works, Samael is described as a leader of the divine forces of destruction, being part of the Qliphoth. He is mentioned again as the serpent's rider, and is described as having mated with Eisheth Zenunim, Na'amah, and Agrat bat Mahlat, all being "angels" of sacred prostitution. Notably, the same work later calls him Azazel, which might be a case of mistaken identity, as Azazel may be himself in Zoharistic lore a combination of the angels Aza and Azrael.

It is also said that the Baal Shem Tov once summoned Samael to make him do his bidding.

Other tradition
Samael is also depicted as the angel of death and one of the seven archangels, the ruler over the Fifth Heaven and commander of two million angels such as the chief of other destroying angels.

According to apocryphal Gedulat Moshe (The Apocalypse of Moses, "The Ascension of Moses" in The Legends of the Jews by Louis Ginzberg) Samael is also mentioned as being in 7th Heaven:

Gnosticism 

In the Apocryphon of John, On the Origin of the World, and Hypostasis of the Archons, found in the Nag Hammadi library, Samael is one of three names of the demiurge, whose other names are Yaldabaoth, Saklas and Yahweh.

After Yaldabaoth claims sole divinity for himself, the voice of Sophia comes forth calling him Samael, due to his ignorance. In On the Origin of the World, his name is explained as "blind god" and his fellow Archons are said to be blind, too. This reflecting the characteristics of the Christian devil, making people blind, as does the devil in 2 Corinthians 4. Also Samael is the first sinner in the Hypostasis of the Archons and the First Epistle of John calls the devil as sinner from the beginning. These characteristics combined with his boasting conflates the Jewish god with the devil. His appearance is that of a lion-faced serpent. Although the Gnostics and Jewish originally used the same source, both depictions of Samael developed independently.

Samael is sometimes confused in some books with Camael, who appears in the Coptic Gospel of the Egyptians also as an evil power, whose name is similar to words meaning "like God" (but Camael with a waw missing). The name might be explained, because in Jewish traditions, the snake had the form of a camel, before it was banished by God.

Anthroposophy 
To anthroposophists, Samael is known as one of the seven archangels: Saint Gregory gives the seven archangels as Anael, Gabriel, Michael, Oriphiel, Raphael, Samael, and Zerachiel. They are all imagined to have a special assignment to act as a global zeitgeist ('time-spirit'), each for periods of about 360 years.

Samiri in the Quran 
According to the Quranic retelling of the story of the Exodus in the 20th chapter (sūrah), a figure called Samiri is blamed for tempting the Hebrews into worshipping the Golden calf. While mufassirs (exegetes) remain undecided about the identity of the Samiri, Abraham Geiger proposed that Samiri is a corruption of the Talmudic accuser angel Samael. The same function is applied to Samael in the Midrash Pirke De-Rabbi Eliezer. The Arabic letter rāʾ is supposed to have entered through a nickname for Samael; Somron.

See also
 Azazel
 List of angels in theology

Citations

General and cited references

Further reading 
 
 
 
  published in four parts:

External links 
 "Samael"—Jewish Encyclopedia entry
 Samael and Lilith - Biblical hints

Angels in the Book of Enoch
Angels of death
Angels in Islam
Archangel in Judaism
Christianity and Judaism
Devils
Fallen angels
Garden of Eden
Gnosticism
Individual angels
Islam and Judaism
Qliphoth
Satan
Watchers (angels)